James T. Sanford  was an American politician who represented Tennessee in the United States House of Representatives from 1823 to 1825.

Biography
Sanford was born in the U.S. state of Virginia. He attended the local common schools, and moved to Columbia, Tennessee, where he engaged in agricultural pursuits.

Elected as a Jacksonian Republican to the Eighteenth Congress, Sanford served from March 4, 1823 to March 3, 1825.  He was an unsuccessful candidate for re-election to the Nineteenth Congress in 1825.

While his death date and place of interment is unknown, he contributed a part of his wealth to the establishment of Jackson College at Columbia, Tennessee.

References

External links
 

Democratic-Republican Party members of the United States House of Representatives from Tennessee